The Abiathar and Nancy White House is a historic building located in Burlington, Iowa, United States. Built c. 1840, this is the largest Federal-style building in the city. Abiathar and Nancy White moved their family to Burlington from Dighton, Massachusetts in 1838. They acquired this property the same year. Abiathar was a carpenter who may have built this house.  One of Abiathar and Nancy's sons, Charles Abiathar White, became a well-known geologist and paleontologist.  This was his childhood home.

The house was built as a single-family dwelling, but since 1850 it has been listed as a multiple-family dwelling. It was built into a limestone hillside. The brick structure rises three stories and includes an attic. It features side gables with parapets between the chimneys, dentiled brick cornice, limestone lintels and sills, and a two-story frame front porch. It was listed on the National Register of Historic Places in 2014.

References

Houses completed in 1840
Houses in Burlington, Iowa
Federal architecture in Iowa
National Register of Historic Places in Des Moines County, Iowa
Houses on the National Register of Historic Places in Iowa